Jelena Janković was the defending champion, but lost to Caroline Garcia in the final, 3–6, 4–6.

Seeds

 Jelena Janković (final)
 Sloane Stephens (first round)
 Karin Knapp (first round)
 Anna Karolína Schmiedlová (first round)

 Caroline Garcia (champion)
 Vania King (semifinals)
 Paula Ormaechea (second round)
 Lourdes Domínguez Lino (quarterfinals)

Draw

Finals

Top half

Bottom half

Qualifying

Seeds

  Nicole Gibbs (qualified)
  Lara Arruabarrena (qualified)
  Adriana Pérez (first round)
  Florencia Molinero (qualified)
  Sachia Vickery (qualified)
  Julia Cohen (second round)
  Sofia Shapatava (qualifying competition, lucky loser)
  Anastasia Grymalska (first round)

Qualifiers

  Nicole Gibbs
  Lara Arruabarrena
  Sachia Vickery
  Florencia Molinero

Lucky losers

  Sofia Shapatava
  Irina Khromacheva

Qualifying draw

First qualifier

Second qualifier

Third qualifier

Fourth qualifier

References
 Main Draw
 Qualifying Draw

Copa Sony Ericsson Colsanitas - Singles
2013 Singles